Érik Chvojka (born October 26, 1986) is a Canadian former professional tennis player.

Chvojka's first ATP World Tour main-draw singles appearance was a close three-set loss in the first round of the 2011 Rogers Cup to world No. 21 Alexandr Dolgopolov. Chvojka has also made the main draw of the 2012 BRD Năstase Țiriac Trophy in Romania as a lucky loser, but lost to Cedrik-Marcel Stebe in the first round.

ATP Challenger Tour and ITF Futures finals

Singles: 13 (6–7)

Doubles: 33 (16–17)

Personal
Chvojka speaks French, Czech, and English.

References

External links

1986 births
Living people
Canadian male tennis players
Canadian people of Czech descent
Tennis players from Montreal
20th-century Canadian people
21st-century Canadian people